Binji is a Bantu language of eastern Democratic Republic of the Congo. Maho (2009) states that it is close to Songe, which is otherwise isolated within the Luban languages established by Ahmed (1995).

In the literature it has been confused with Mbagani, which goes by the same name. For instance, Guthrie assigned code L.22 "Binji" to what Maho labels Mbagani; in Maho, true Binji is L.231. The two languages are separated by 200 km.

References 

Luban languages
Languages of the Democratic Republic of the Congo